Dinahs Corner is an unincorporated community in Kent County, Delaware, United States. Dinahs Corner is located at the intersection of Pearsons Corner Road and Dinahs Corner Road, northwest of Dover.

References

Unincorporated communities in Kent County, Delaware
Unincorporated communities in Delaware